Hotel Kinston is an historic hotel building located at Kinston, Lenoir County, North Carolina. It was built in 1927–1928, and is an 11-story, steel frame Art Deco style building.  It is sheathed in red brick with cast stone Moorish stylistic details at the main entrance and top floors.  It was operated as a hotel until the 1960s. It houses senior citizen apartments.

It was listed on the National Register of Historic Places in 1989.

References

Hotel buildings on the National Register of Historic Places in North Carolina
Art Deco architecture in North Carolina
Hotel buildings completed in 1928
Buildings and structures in Lenoir County, North Carolina
National Register of Historic Places in Lenoir County, North Carolina
1928 establishments in North Carolina